Khwabon Ke Darmiyaan is a TV show which aired on Doordarshan National on 17 November 2014 and This TV Shows Tagline is "Sach aur sapno se jhoojhti zindagi"  The show has televised over 300 episodes in the prime time evening slot of 7:30 pm from Monday to Thursday.

Cast
Nishant Pandey as Nishant (Male lead)
Harsha Khandeparkar as Ashtha (Main female lead)
Shashwat Bhasin
Maansi Jain(Antagonist)
Latisha Surve
Chandan Madan as Aasman Saxena (Doctor)

References

Hindi-language television shows
Indian drama television series
Indian television soap operas
2014 Indian television series debuts
2016 Indian television series endings
DD National original programming